Rosker is a surname. Notable people with the surname include:

Jana S. Rošker (born 1960), Slovenian sinologist
Mark Jeffrey Rosker, American engineer

See also
Roser (name)
Rosser (surname)